Kahriz (also Romanized as Kahrīz) is a village in Chahriq Rural District, Kuhsar District, Salmas County, West Azerbaijan Province, Iran. At the 2006 census, its population was 354, in 64 families.

References 

Populated places in Salmas County